Origawa Dam is a gravity dam located in Gifu Prefecture in Japan. The dam is used for flood control and power production. The catchment area of the dam is 55 km2. The dam impounds about 111  ha of land when full and can store 15100 thousand cubic meters of water. The construction of the dam was started on 1979 and completed in 2003.

References

Dams in Gifu Prefecture